Siena College is a private Franciscan college in Loudonville, New York. Siena was founded by the Order of Friars Minor in 1937. The college was named after Bernardino of Siena, a 15th-century Italian Franciscan friar and preacher. St. Bernardine of Siena Friary is located on campus. The college has 3,000 full-time students and offers undergraduate degrees in business, liberal arts, and sciences.

History 

In the late 1930s, Thomas Plassmann, president of St. Bonaventure University in Western New York, sent seven Franciscan friars to New York's Capital Region to found another college.

A new rugby pitch was opened in fall 2016 and a new bookstore opened in fall 2014. The Siena College Grotto opened in October 2014.  The college was listed as a census-designated place (Siena College CDP) in 2020.

Academics

Schools 
Siena College students attend three schools within the college:
 School of Business
 School of Liberal Arts
 School of Science

School of Business 
The School of Business is accredited by AACSB International. Departments in the school include:

 Accounting and Business Law
 Economics 
 Finance
 M.S. in Accounting
 Management
 Marketing
 Quantitative Business Analysis

School of Liberal Arts 
Departments in the School of Liberal Arts include:

 American Studies
 Creative Arts
 Education
 English
 History
 Health Studies
 Modern Languages and Classics
 Philosophy
 Political Science
 Psychology
 Religious Studies
 Social Work
 Sociology

School of Science 
Departments in the Science include:

 Biology
 Chemistry and Biochemistry
 Computer Science
 Environmental Studies and Sciences
 Mathematics
 Nursing
 Physics and Astronomy

Campus
The campus includes: 
Siena Hall
The main college building, housing classrooms and administrator and faculty offices. The cupola at the top is used as the symbol of the college, appearing on the college logo and most printed and web material.
J. Spencer and Patricia Standish Library
Built in 1999, it has space for 400,000 volumes, seating for 700 readers, networking for 500 computer connections, 100 computer work stations, an audio-visual center, an archive and special collections suite, 11 group study rooms, 16 faculty carrels, and training laboratory and demonstration classrooms.
Roger Bacon Hall
Houses the School of Science offices and classrooms as well as the Computer Science, Psychology, Mathematics, and Physics Departments.
Morrell Science Center
Attached to Roger Bacon Hall and built in 2001, it houses the chemistry, biochemistry and biology departments.
 Rossetti Hall
Classrooms and faculty offices. Notable for the solar panels on the roof
Kiernan Hall
Classrooms and faculty offices.  Notable for the design: the first floor consist of two sections separated by an outdoor walkway, with the second floor bridging the two sections.
Foy Hall (former athletic center)
Home to the creative arts department, campus theatre and studio of Siena College Television.
Marcelle Athletic Complex
Athletic offices and facilities.
Sarazen Student Union
Houses the post office, campus radio station, Student Affairs office, student government offices, and campus hangout Casey's
There are eight residential living areas on campus: Cushing Village (four or six person townhouses), Hennepin Hall (six story traditional dorm building), Hines Hall (five story traditional dorm building for freshman, also has Public Safety and admin offices), MacClosky Square (six or eight person townhouses), Padua Hall (traditional dorm building, second newest hall on campus), Plassmann Hall, Ryan Hall, (exclusively for Freshmen), and Snyder Hall (recently renamed). which was just built in 2010. The residence halls tend to be concentrated in the middle of campus and at the southern end while the townhouse residences are concentrated along the northern edge of campus off Fiddlers Lane and were at first controversial with the Newtonville community. When the first townhouses were proposed the Newtonville Homeowners Association unsuccessfully sued to block construction. Subsequent construction has not been controversial thanks to the town board including the Newtonville Homeowners Association in the decision-making process.
 A Friary provides housing for the Franciscan friars that are involved with the campus.

Student life

Student organizations 
Students are involved in a number of wide, specific, academic related, recreational, leadership building, and diverse organizations and clubs or campus. There are currently 85 organizations on campus, each with their own campus, local, or national impact.

Leadership organizations

Student Senate 
The Siena College Student Senate serves as a liaison between student and both faculty and administration. It works to present and to interpret students’ attitudes, opinions, and rights to the teaching faculty and administration. The Senate is charged with the oversight of clubs and the distribution of the student activities fees. While Senate does not directly control college academic or social policies, it continues to work with a group of cooperative administrators to shape them in ways that will benefit the community.

The Student Senate has an executive board including president, vice president, secretary, and treasurer. The rest of the Senate is representatives, hall and town house representatives, and commuter representatives. Student Senate is the governing body for all clubs and organizations on campus.

Student Events Board 
The Student Events Board (SEB) sponsors traditional types of entertainment in the form of bands, comedians, and speakers, but also presents other non-traditional events designed for Siena such as coffeehouse acts, open mic nights, Winter Weekend, Siblings Weekend, Charity Week, big concerts, as well as SienaFest. SEB also oversees and regulates the sale and distribution of goods and services of campus clubs and organizations.

Residence Hall Association 
The mission of the Residence Hall Association (RHA) is to act as a governing student body; to serve as the official liaison between the residential students at Siena College with Siena College staff and administration; to strive to make Siena's residence halls and townhouses a desirable community; to be the official voice of Siena's residential students; and to serve as a programming organization within residential communities.

Athletics 

Siena offers 21 NCAA Division I sports, all of which participate in the Metro Atlantic Athletic Conference (MAAC).

The college generally only competed against local schools in athletics until being elevated to the Division I level in 1976. At this time, Siena became a member of the ECAC, and later the North Atlantic Conference, a forerunner to the present day America East Conference. In 1990, the college moved to the MAAC where it has remained since. Siena has not always been known by its present moniker. Athletic teams were first known as the Golden Hurricanes and later as the Indians. In March 1989, the school adopted its current nickname, the Saints.

Many of Siena's athletic teams have experienced success at the Division I level. The college's most well known squad is the men's basketball team. The Saints have appeared in six NCAA Tournaments, advancing to the Round of 32 in 1989, 2008 and 2009. Siena has also played in the postseason NIT five times, capturing third place in 1994. In 2014, Siena competed in their first College Basketball Invitational tournament and won the championship defeating Stony Brook, Penn State, Illinois State and Fresno State two games to one in the best-of-three championship series. The women's basketball teams has also had a recent run of success, including a trip to the NCAA tournament in 2001, and appearances in the 1999, 2002 and 2003 WNIT. They finished second in the 2015 WBI.

Another team with recent high achievement is men's baseball. The Saints advanced to the 1999 NCAA Division I baseball tournament and in 2005 saw pitcher John Lannan drafted by the Washington Nationals. Lannan has since become a regular starter in Washington's rotation. They also participated in the 2014 NCAA Division I Baseball Tournament, after winning the MAAC Championship over Canisius.

Finally, the men's lacrosse team has also improved significantly in recent years. The Saints qualified for their first MAAC tournament in 2007 and their first NCAA tournament in 2009. That season, the Saints secured an automatic berth in the tournament after winning their first MAAC championship during a ten-game winning streak.

Siena College Research Institute 
Siena College Research Institute, an affiliate of Siena College, conducts expert and public opinion polls, focusing on New York State and the United States, on issues of public policy interest.

Notable alumni 

Siena College has approximately 28,000 living alumni worldwide, including former college president Kevin J. Mullen. In the fields of journalism and literature, notable Siena graduates include: William J. Kennedy, 1984 Pulitzer Prize for Fiction winner; Erich Hartmann, international award-winning photojournalist and former president of Magnum Photos; David Hepp, award-winning journalist and creator of Inside Albany and Ed Henry, senior White House correspondent for Fox News. In the fields of law and government, notable Siena graduates include: Francis Bergan, former presiding justice of the New York Court of Appeals; Michael Botticelli, director of the Office of National Drug Control Policy; Constantine George Cholakis, former judge of the United States District Court for the Northern District of New York; George Deukmejian, 35th governor of California; former United States representatives from New York Jack Quinn and Gerald B. H. Solomon; and Henry F. Zwack, justice of the New York Supreme Court, Third Judicial District.

Notable faculty
Mark A. Heckler, professor of fine arts

References

External links

Siena Saints Athletics website

 
Franciscan universities and colleges
Catholic universities and colleges in New York (state)
Colonie, New York
Education in Capital District (New York)
Universities and colleges in Albany County, New York
Association of Catholic Colleges and Universities
Educational institutions established in 1937
1937 establishments in New York (state)